Ōtemachi Station is the name of two train stations in Japan.
 Ōtemachi Station (Ehime) - (大手町駅) in Matsuyama, Ehime Prefecture
 Ōtemachi Station (Tokyo) - (大手町駅) in Tokyo